Giorgio Davide Boccardo Bosoni (born 20 November 1982) is a Chilean politician and scholar who currently serves as Undersecretary of Labour.

From 2006 to 2007, he was the president of the University of Chile Student Federation.

References

External links
 

1982 births
Living people
Pontifical Catholic University of Valparaíso alumni
University of Chile alumni
Presidents of the University of Chile Student Federation
21st-century Chilean politicians
Members of the SurDA Movement
Izquierda Autónoma politicians
Commons (political party) politicians